Aleksey Khovansky may refer to:
Aleksey Khovansky (fencer) (born 1987), Russian foil fencer
Aleksey Khovansky (publisher) (1814–1899), Russian filolog and publisher